Magpie Island is an island in the River Thames in England near the villages of Aston, Berkshire and Medmenham, Buckinghamshire. It is situated on the reach above Hurley Lock.

Navigation is believed to have passed originally down the present backwater which was then cluttered with eel bucks. In the eighteenth century the island was part of the Culham Court estate.

References

Islands of Berkshire
Islands of the River Thames
Remenham